Westfall Fork is a stream in the U.S. state of West Virginia.

Westfall Fork most likely was named after a man named Westfall who was known to have settled in the area in the 1770s.

See also
List of rivers of West Virginia

References

Rivers of Braxton County, West Virginia
Rivers of West Virginia